Phil Minnick (born December 28, 1942) was a Canadian football linebacker who played for the Winnipeg Blue Bombers. He played college football at the University of Northern Iowa. As a rookie linebacker, he played in 14 games and intercepted one pass on a team that lost the 53rd Grey Cup. Minnick went on to play solid run defense and intercepted a total of 11 passes up to his final year in 1973. He was a CFL-West all-star in 1966 and 1968 and an All-CFL all star in 1968 and 1969, though during the latter year injuries curtailed him to playing only 9 games. A knee injury further limited him to playing only 1 game in 1970, none in 1971, and 8 in 1972, but he reached 15 games in his final year.

References

1942 births
Living people
American football linebackers
Canadian football linebackers
American players of Canadian football
Iowa State Cyclones football players
Winnipeg Blue Bombers players